Gabriel Boric Font (born 11 February 1986) is a Chilean politician and the current president of Chile, having taken office on 11 March 2022. He studied law at the University of Chile, but did not complete his education. Boric gained recognition as a student leader, serving as the president of the University of Chile Student Federation from 2011 to 2012 and as a prominent figure in the 2011–2013 Chilean student protests.

Boric was twice elected to the Chamber of Deputies, representing the Magallanes and Antarctic district. He first ran as an independent candidate in 2013, and then as part of the Broad Front coalition in 2017. Boric is a founding member of Social Convergence, which is one of the parties that make up the Broad Front.

During the 2019 civil unrest in Chile, Boric played a key role in negotiating the agreement that led to a constitutional referendum. Although the more progressive constitution that he supported was ultimately rejected, Boric was selected as the presidential candidate of the Apruebo Dignidad coalition. This coalition was composed of the Broad Front, the Communist Party, and other smaller movements. Boric won the presidential primary election with 60% of the popular vote and went on to defeat José Antonio Kast in the second round of the presidential election, securing 55.9% of the votes. As a result, Boric became the youngest president in Chilean history and currently is the second youngest state leader in the world, after Ibrahim Traoré of Burkina Faso.

Early life

Family
On his father's side, Boric is from a Croatian Chilean family from Ugljan, an island off Croatia's Adriatic coast. Although his ancestors left what was then the Austro-Hungarian Empire for Chile in 1897, he still has relatives on Ugljan. Boric's great-grandfather Juan Boric (Ive Borić Barešić) arrived with his brother Simón (Šime) to Punta Arenas around 1885, reportedly being among the first ten Croats to arrive in Magallanes. In Magallanes, the two brothers joined the ongoing Tierra del Fuego gold rush spending time in the islands south of Beagle Channel. Juan Boric went briefly back to Ugljan to marry and brought his wife, Natalia Crnosija, to Magallanes where ten of their eleven children were born. Boric's grandfather Luis Boric Crnosij, born in 1908, was one of these children. Gabriel Boric's mother is María Soledad Font Aguilera, of Spanish  descent.

In the Patagonian region of Magallanes, one of his granduncles, Vladimiro Boric, served as the first bishop of Punta Arenas. Roque Scarpa Martinich, another of his granduncles, was the first intendant of Magallanes Region after the end of the military dictatorship. Both Roque Scarpa and his own father were members of the Christian Democratic Party.

Gabriel Boric was born in Punta Arenas in 1986. He has two brothers, Simón and Tomás.

Education
Boric studied at The British School in his hometown. He then moved to Santiago to study at University of Chile's law school in 2004. He finished his courses in 2009, the same year he became President of the Law School students' union. He then prepared for his degree's final exam and completed his mandatory internship. However, he failed the test in 2011 and did not take it a second time. Boric never received a law degree and has mentioned in interviews he never expected to work as a lawyer, saying he preferred to be a writer instead.

During part of his time at university Boric earned a slot as assistant to professor José Zalaquett in the latter's human rights course. In an interview, Zalaquett has valued Boric for "his capacity to doubt".

Political career

Student politics 

In 1999 and 2000, Boric participated in the re-establishment of the Federation of Secondary School Students of Punta Arenas. While at university, he joined the political collective Autonomous Left, initially known as Autonomous Students. He was an advisor to the Students' Union of the Law Department in 2008 and became its president in 2009, when he led a protest for 44 days against the dean Roberto Nahum. He also represented students as a university senator from 2010 to 2012.

Boric was a candidate for the leadership of the University of Chile Student Federation (FECH) as part of the list  in the elections of 5–6 December 2011. He was elected president with 30.52% of the votes, defeating Camila Vallejo, who was then the president of the federation running for re-election as part of the list Communist Youth of Chile.

During his time as president of the FECH, Boric faced the second part of the student protests that began in 2011, becoming one of the main spokespersons of the Federation of Chilean Students. In 2012, he was included on the list of 100 young leaders of Chile, published by the Saturday magazine of the newspaper , in collaboration with Adolfo Ibáñez University.

Member of Chamber of Deputies (2014–2022) 

Boric ran in the 2013 parliamentary elections as an independent candidate to represent District 60 (currently District 28), which encompasses the Region of Magallanes and the Chilean Antarctic. He was elected with 15,418 votes (26.2%), the highest number received by any candidate in the region. The media highlighted the fact that Boric was elected outside of an electoral coalition, thereby successfully breaking through the Chilean bi-nominal election system.

Boric was sworn in as a member of the Chamber of Deputies on 11 March 2014. During his first term, Boric sat on the Commissions for Human Rights and Indigenous Peoples; Extreme Zones and the Chilean Antarctic; and Labour and Social Security. Boric was part of the so-called "student bench" along with other young elected deputies that were part of the 2011 protests: Camila Vallejo, Giorgio Jackson and Karol Cariola. The deputies were very active in debates related to the educational reforms proposed by the second government of Michelle Bachelet. Boric was mentioned as one of the most popular politicians in Chile according to different opinion polls.

Autonomous Left was disbanded in 2016 after disagreements about the future of the collective, with Boric proposing a more institutional approach and dialog with the center-left government of Bachelet. Another disagreement was that the leadership of the Autonomous Left preferred to remain focused on student politics, while Boric and his allies had according to Autonomous Left's Carlos Ruiz a "compulsion for a rapid rise". Boric, Nicolás Grau, Jorge Sharp and Gonzalo Winter then founded the Autonomist Movement with the intention to join other political forces and create a new leftist coalition, similar to the Uruguayan Broad Front. The new Autonomist Movement saw good electoral results; for instance, Jorge Sharp, one of Boric's closest friends, was elected as mayor of Valparaíso in its 2016 municipal elections. In January 2017, the Chilean Broad Front was launched by Boric's movement along with other new parties and collectives, including Jackson's Democratic Revolution. Boric was then one of the leaders behind Beatriz Sánchez's campaign in the 2017 presidential election. After Sánchez landed in the third place and failed to qualify for the second round, Boric reluctantly supported Alejandro Guillier as a way to defeat Sebastián Piñera, though Piñera eventually won.

In the 2017 general election, Boric ran for re-election as an independent candidate supported by the Humanist Party, one of the founding members of the Broad Front. He obtained 18,626 votes (32.8%), increasing his votes compared to 2013 and becoming the second most voted deputy in the country at the time. He sat on the Commissions for Extreme Zones and the Chilean Antarctic; and Constitution, Legislation, Justice and Regulation.

The overall good results of the Broad Front in the 2017 elections, when it became the third largest political force in Chile, was a catalyst for the re-organization of the coalition and its members. The Autonomist Movement along with Libertarian Left and other smaller movements decided in 2018 to merge and create a political party called Social Convergence.

Role in the 

After riots started in different places of the capital, President Piñera established a state of emergency in Santiago, which was later extended to all major cities of the country as the protests grew. Protesters incorporated demands about the general cost of living, corruption and inequality, among other causes. Boric was a strong critic of the government's response and opposed the use of the Chilean Armed Forces to repress the protests, even confronting a group of soldiers deployed in Plaza Italia. He was one of the accusers in the impeachment trial against Interior Minister Andrés Chadwick, who was found guilty of human rights violations against protesters and was barred from holding public office for five years. Boric also supported the impeachment of President Piñera, although it was eventually rejected.

Despite being one of the main critics of the government's response to the protests, Boric was also open to dialog with other political forces to find a solution to the crisis. Conversations between him and right-wing politicians helped to reach an agreement that would pave the way for the establishment of the Constitutional Convention to write a new Constitution. On 15 November 2019, the "Agreement for Social Peace and the New Constitution" was signed by the presidents of the political parties represented in parliament, with the exception of the Communist Party and some members of the Broad Front, including Social Convergence. Boric signed the agreement as an individual, which led to accusations against him by some of his party's fellow members; some of them even resigned from the party, including his personal friend Jorge Sharp. The Green Ecologist Party, the Humanist Party and the Equality Party also opposed the agreement and left the Broad Front, along with other smaller movements like the Pirate Party and the Libertarian Left. On 20 December, Boric was attacked at Parque Forestal by people who threw spit and beer at him and called him a "traitor" and "sell-out" because of his participation in the "Agreement for Social Peace and a New Constitution" that was agreed upon with traditional politicians. Boric remained calm and did not leave his bench.

2021 presidential candidacy 

During 2020, the conflict with the government increased due to the impact of the COVID-19 pandemic in Chile while the civil unrest was on a suspended state due to lockdowns in most of the country. After 78% of the voters supported the idea of a new Constitution in the October 2020 referendum, several talks were held to articulate a united opposition in the May 2021 elections of mayors, regional governors and members of the Constitutional Convention. Boric supported a coordination between all the parties and the registration of fewer electoral lists to avoid a dispersion of voters. In the end, the Broad Front and  reached an agreement to present a common list called , which became the second largest bloc in the Constitutional Convention (only behind the united pact of the right).  also increased their results in the local and regional elections, becoming a competitive option for the November 2021 general election.

Daniel Jadue, the Communist mayor of Recoleta, was the leading candidate to represent the left in the presidential election according to preliminary opinion polls. The Broad Front initially supported Beatriz Sánchez to run again as their presidential candidate. However, she rejected the proposal and instead ran for the Constitutional Convention. Without their main candidate, the Broad Front looked for options but most of their candidates were either not very popular or were not of the required age to run for president. Eventually, 35-year-old Boric became an option, at least to participate in a primary election against Jadue. However, Social Convergence did not have the minimum number of members to present a presidential candidate. In record time, a campaign was created so Boric could run, meeting the required number of signatures a day before the deadline.

Against all expectations, Boric won the  primary election on 19 July 2021 with 1,059,060 votes (60.4%), while Jadue received 39.6%. Boric was also the most voted candidate in the general primary, surpassing all candidates of the  primary which was held simultaneously. Following his primary victory, Boric announced on Twitter that he would work together with Jadue during the general election in order to present a united front.

According to the main opinion polls, Boric and  candidate Sebastián Sichel were frontrunners for the presidential election. However, Sichel's popularity plummeted a few months later and was surpassed by far-right candidate José Antonio Kast in the polls. In the first round of the election held on 21 November, Boric obtained 25.82% of the vote, second to Kast's 27.91%, and therefore went on to the second round. On 19 December 2021, Boric won the runoff with 55.85% of the vote. His inauguration was held on 11 March 2022.

Presidency (2022–present)

Cabinet

Boric announced the ministers of his cabinet in January 2022. The ministers who took office are part of the Apruebo Dignidad and Democratic Socialism coalitions, and there are also independents. Fourteen out of twenty-four ministers are women, making it the first cabinet in the Americas where more than half of its members are women. The ministers include Alexandra Benado and Marco Antonio Ávila, the first openly LGBT ministers in Chile's history, and Maya Fernández Allende, the granddaughter of former president Salvador Allende. Boric also included 3 fellow former student leaders in his cabinet: Camila Vallejo, who became the government spokesperson, Giorgio Jackson, who became the secretary-general of the presidency and Nicolás Grau who became Minister of Economy, Development, and Tourism.

Amidst speculations of being appointed Minister of Finance, Ricardo Ffrench-Davis explained that being 85 made him too old to fulfill the task but that he would be glad to give advice. Once Mario Marcel was announced as future finance minister in January 2022, the Santiago Stock Exchange reacted positively with the IPSA rising 2.35%.

Violence against government officials
During the first months of government Boric and people associated to his government have been subject of threats, violent crime and physical aggression. In mid-March Minister of Interior and Public Security Izkia Siches was received with gunfire during a visit to Temucuicui and had to be evacuated. In April Boric was attacked by a man who attempted to throw a stone at him. In the night of 13 May one of Boric's bodyguards was kidnapped and shot in the arm by unknown assailants. On the same day the house of the Minister of National Defense Maya Fernández was robbed. According to Chilean police these last two events are not related.

Mapuche conflict
In May 2022, Boric decided to deploy troops to the southern part of the country, amidst rising violence in the Mapuche conflict. According to Argentine newspaper Clarín, Boric lost support from the Communist Party with this move. Boric had previously distanced himself from  similar measures taken by his predecessor, Piñera. Prior to this decision by Boric, the leader of one of the Mapuche militias, Héctor Llaitul, had called to "prepare forces and organize armed resistance". In an initial response to this statement, Boric's government had dismissed the idea of presenting a formal lawsuit against Llaitul, considering that the state "does not persecute ideas" and that they would add these statements to already filed complaints and to not start new complaints.

Vote on proposed constitution 
In September 2022, the more progressive constitution proposed by the Constitutional Convention, whose work extended between 4 July 2021 (during former president Sebastián Piñera's government) and 4 July 2022 (four months into Boric's government), was rejected by a margin of 62% to 38%. The proposed constitution had faced "intense criticism that it was too long, too left-leaning and too radical".

Foreign relations 
Boric condemned the 2022 Russian invasion of Ukraine. In a tweet, he posted "Russia has opted for war as a means of resolving conflicts. From Chile we condemn the invasion of Ukraine, the violation of its sovereignty and the illegitimate use of force. Our solidarity will be with the victims and our humble efforts with peace."

Boric made his first presidential trip in April 2022, to Argentina, where he met with president Fernández. In Argentina, Boric said that remaining territorial disputes with Argentina would be solved, and added that brotherhood between Argentina and Chile must exist regardless of the presidents in charge, and reiterated his support for Argentina's sovereignty over the Falkland Islands.

On 15 September 2022, Boric refused to receive the credentials of Israeli Ambassador to Chile Gil Artzyeli in response to the deaths of children during the 2022 Gaza–Israel clashes in Gaza Strip. The ambassador's credentials would instead be accepted in mid-October. Artzyeli was already at Chile's presidential palace at the time of the refusal. This refusal resulted in backlash from the Jewish Community of Chile and caused a diplomatic crisis between Chile and Israel. Chilean Foreign Minister Antonia Urrejola apologized to Israel and to Israeli President Isaac Herzog for the incident and rescheduled Artzyeli's accreditation to the end of September. Boric has declined to apologize for the incident, but said that "I want to express to the Jewish community that they should know that like every Chilean and every person who lives in our country, no one will ever be persecuted or intimidated for their ideas or worldviews, unless they break the law".

Reparations related to the 2019–2020 protests

The government of Gabriel Boric has established grace pensions of up to 515,672 Chilean pesos for those who suffered human rights violations in the context of the 2019–2020 protest. People who suffered human rights violations between 18 October 2019 and 31 June 2020 are qualified for the grace pensions. The National Institute of Human Rights (INDH) has criticized the uncertainty regarding if these pensions are compatible with disability pensions. Some members of congress also expressed the concern that grace pensions have been granted to people whose trials have not yet finished, and that the possibility that injuries were related to severe acts of violence on their behalf has thus not yet been dispelled.

Approval ratings 
Boric entered into office with a 50 percent approval rating. After his first 100 days, his approval rating had fallen to 32.8 percent, the largest fall in popularity during a Chilean President's first 100 days since 1990. His approval rating remained low at the end of 2022, hovering around 33%, with nearly six-in-ten disapproving of Boric's performance.

Political positions 

Gabriel Boric is a left-wing politician,  who has been described along a wide range of positions, including socialism, social democracy, and libertarian socialism. In this regard, Boric has said, “I come from the Chilean libertarian socialist tradition, that is my ideological space of reference. I am a democrat, and I believe that democracy has to change and adapt and not petrify." He has also mentioned that he has some "ideological closeness" to Bolivia's former vice president Álvaro García Linera. The Economist has called Boric "woke" and part of the millennial left "with a program focused on social justice, human rights, the environment and feminism".  Cristián Warnken and Carlos Peña agree on Boric being a "postmodern leader". Peña credits Boric and the Broad Front for bringing together widely different demands that have emerged as Chilean society has modernized.

Boric criticized the social and economic model established in Chile during the dictatorship and considers it continued after the transition to democracy. During the 2021 election, he pledged to end the country's neoliberal economic model, stating that "if Chile was the cradle of neoliberalism, it will also be its grave." He has mentioned that, during the center-left Concertación governments, "the people were left aside by consensus politics that consolidated the current neoliberal Chile." However, in latter years, especially after his election as president, he has adopted a more nuanced vision, recognizing that "there were successes and things that didn't go well."

Boric has supported the recognition of LGBT rights in Chile and included the legal recognition of non-binary identities and the expansion of the gender identity law as part of his presidential campaign program. 

In 2016 he defended a program to put 400 convicts in Valparaíso on probation given the state of overcrowding in Chilean prisons. He criticized what he saw as penal populism on behalf of other deputies who opposed the probation. In a debate of the Apruebo Dignidad primaries of 2021 Boric again criticized "penal populism" as failing to bring effective solutions.

Boric has been critical of pine and eucalyptus plantations which would according to him have caused drought among indigenous Mapuche communities of "Wallmapu". He vowed in 2021 that the big forestry companies would have a "slow down" in his Government. In an interview at Televisión Nacional de Chile on 1 May 2022 Boric remarked again that he was critical of the forestry industry.

Economic policy
During his political career, Boric has insisted that education should be a right and not be available for profit, and has pledged to forgive the student loans and end the program as a president. Boric has also proposed to diminish private participation in critical sectors. Regarding the health system, Boric has called to establish a universal publicly funded health care system, citing the British NHS as an example, while he has also called to abolish the AFP pension system and replacing it with a public autonomous entity to administer the pension funds.

Boric has promoted a law to establish a 40-hour working week and increase the minimum wage. Also, he has proposed workers' representatives and gender equality in the composition of boards of large companies. Regarding mining, the largest industry in Chile, Boric has proposed the creation of a state company for lithium extraction, increase the royalties paid by extracting companies and protect the environment. Boric has mentioned that one of the main pillars of his presidency will be to face the impact of climate change and promote a green economy.

When Boric assumed the presidency, Chile's inflation rate was at its highest level for almost 30 years. In April 2022, Boric announced a $3.7 billion economic recovery plan that included a minimum wage hike to help people deal with rising prices. The inflation rate has decreased under Boric, but remains high at 11.5 percent as of May 2022, the highest level in 28 years.

Foreign policy 

Boric has said that "the democratic left should not have a double standard on human rights or use the principle of self-determination to justify human rights violations". He also has said that, "just as the left must condemn the violation of human rights in Chile during the dictatorship and also today, the soft coups in Brazil, Honduras and Paraguay, the Israeli-occupied territories, or the interventionism of the United States, we must from the left with the same force condemn the permanent restriction of freedoms in Cuba, the repressive government of Ortega in Nicaragua, the dictatorship in China and the weakening of the basic conditions of democracy in Venezuela". Following his election to the presidency, Boric further declared that "Venezuela is a failed experience and the main demonstration is the 6 million Venezuelans in diaspora." During his 2021 presidential campaign, he said that the 2021 Nicaraguan general election was fraudulent and called on the Communist Party of Chile, one of his allies, to rescind its original statement supporting Daniel Ortega's government. Boric has been critical of President of Brazil Jair Bolsonaro and his stance regarding the crimes of the military dictatorship of Brazil (1964–1985). He has also called Bolsonaro "a danger for the environment and for humanity." Bolsonaro, in turn, has had a cold attitude towards Boric since the latter's election in December 2021, and Bolsonaro announced in January 2022 that he would not attend Boric's inauguration as president.

Regarding Bolivia, Boric has mentioned his intentions to re-establish diplomatic relations between both countries, after they were severed in 1978. He has supported Argentina's position regarding the Falkland Islands. Boric has also expressed sympathy towards the government of Alberto Fernández, and has pledged to support Argentina during its debt restructuring and its negotiations with the International Monetary Fund. Boric has mentioned that if Lula da Silva and Gustavo Petro win the presidential elections in their respective countries, an interesting axis could be formed.

Boric condemned the 2022 Russian invasion of Ukraine as an "unacceptable war of aggression". Under his presidency, Chile has supported United Nations resolutions demanding the immediate withdrawal of Russian troops from Ukraine, and offered to help the Ukrainian government remove landmines left by Russian forces. However, he has rejected requests to supply Ukraine with weapons, despite the United States offering to replace any equipment the Chilean Armed Forces donated to the Ukrainian war effort.

Regarding the Israeli occupied territories, Boric has supported the State of Palestine on several occasions. In 2019, after he received a gift from an organization called the Jewish Community of Chile, he called for Israel to return the occupied Palestinian territories in a tweet. He called Israel a "genocidal and murderous state" which was violating international treaties and said that "no matter how powerful a country is, we must defend international principles and human rights." Boric has denied accusations of antisemitism and said that he rejects any kind of discrimination. He described the Israeli occupation of territories outside the 1967 borders as a violation of international law. In October 2021, Boric and other deputies presented a bill to forbid the import of products made in Israeli settlements, which are considered illegal by the international community.

Personal life 

Gabriel Boric has been outspoken on mental health issues and his struggles with obsessive–compulsive disorder, having been diagnosed as a child. He took leave from congress for a few weeks after being hospitalized for it in 2018. The improvement of mental health services, especially after the COVID-19 pandemic, was one of the central issues of his presidential campaign.

He was raised in a religious Catholic family, with his mother involved in the Schoenstatt Apostolic Movement. However, Boric considers himself agnostic.

Boric has been in a relationship with anthropologist and sociologist Irina Karamanos since 2019. During Boric's presidential campaign, Karamanos stated her view was that the role of the First Lady should be reconsidered in an approach better suited to modern times.

Boric's love for rock and metal music became widely known during the presidential campaign. Most notably, he has frequently posted in social media about some of his favorite bands like Deftones, Tool, Nine Inch Nails, and Rammstein, although he has also mentioned he enjoys musicians from other genres, like Laura Pausini, Taylor Swift and Jeongyeon. Boric is a supporter of football team Universidad Católica.

Boric's look and style has been scrutinized since his election as a deputy. As one of the youngest members of the Chamber of Deputies, he normally used casual clothes (including jeans and t-shirts) in sessions of the Congress and even had a mohawk hairstyle for some months. In 2014, there was some controversy after Boric did not wear a tie or a formal jacket when he joined the Chamber and a right-wing deputy complained publicly about it. During his presidential campaign, Boric adopted a more formal look but still didn't wear ties. He is also the first Latin American head of state to have visible tattoos; the designs in his arms and back are references to his home region, including a map of the Magallanes Region, a lenga tree and a lighthouse.

Honours

National honours 

  Grand-Master (2022) and Collar of the Order of Merit
  Grand-Master (2022) and Collar of the Order of Bernardo O'Higgins

International honours

Electoral history

2013 parliamentary elections 
2013 parliamentary elections for deputy of District 60 (Río Verde, Antártica, Laguna Blanca, Natales, Cabo de Hornos, Porvenir, Primavera, Punta Arenas, San Gregorio, Timaukel and Torres del Paine)

2017 parliamentary elections 
2017 parliamentary elections for deputy of District 28 (Río Verde, Antártica, Laguna Blanca, Natales, Cabo de Hornos, Porvenir, Primavera, Punta Arenas, San Gregorio, Timaukel and Torres del Paine)

2021 presidential elections

See also 
 Leaders of the 2011 Chilean protests
 Education in Chile

Explanatory notes

References

External links

 Official website 
 
 Biography by CIDOB (in Spanish)

  

 
1986 births
Living people
People from Punta Arenas
Presidents of Chile
Anti-corporate activists
Anti-Zionism in South America
Candidates for President of Chile
Chilean agnostics
Former Roman Catholics
Chilean people of Croatian descent
Chilean people of Spanish descent
Izquierda Autónoma politicians
Social Convergence politicians
Members of the Autonomist Movement
Members of the Chamber of Deputies of Chile
People with obsessive–compulsive disorder
Presidents of the University of Chile Student Federation
University of Chile alumni
20th-century Chilean educators
21st-century Chilean politicians